Parcem is a census town in North Goa district in the Indian state of Goa.

Geography
It has an average elevation of 19 metres (62 feet).

Demographics
 India census, Parcem had a population of 4320. Males constitute 51% of the population and females 49%. Parcem has an average literacy rate of 74%, higher than the national average of 59.5%: male literacy is 81%, and female literacy is 66%. In Parcem, 10% of the population is under 6 years of age.

References

Cities and towns in North Goa district